Lee Yock Suan (born 30 September 1946) is a former Singaporean politician. A member of the governing People's Action Party (PAP), he served in the Cabinet between 1987 and 2004, and was a Member of Parliament (MP) between 1980 and 2006. He is the father of Desmond Lee, the current Minister for National Development.

Career
Lee worked at Singapore's Economic Development Board from 1969 to 1980, initially as a projects officer before becoming Divisional Director (Industry). From 1980 to 1981, he served as Deputy Managing Director of the Petroleum Corporation of Singapore.

Political career
Lee was first elected to Parliament at the 1980 general election. He served as an MP representing the Cheng San Single Member Constituency (1980–88), the Cheng San Group Representation Constituency (1988-2001) and the East Coast Group Representation Constituency (2001–06).

After serving as a Minister of State at the Ministry of National Development and the Ministry of Finance from 1983 to 1984, Lee was made the Acting Minister for Labour in 1985.

He became a full member of the Cabinet in 1987, and served as the Minister for Labour (1987–91), Minister for Education (1992–97), Second Minister for Finance (1997–98), Minister for Trade and Industry (1997–99), Minister for Information and the Arts (1999–2001), Minister for the Environment (1999–2001), Second Minister for Foreign Affairs (2001–04) and Minister in the Prime Minister's Office (2001–04).

Lee also served as the Deputy Chairman of the People's Association from 1984 to 1991, and as Chairman of the Singapore Labour Foundation from 1997 to 2002.

Lee stepped down from the Cabinet in 2004. He remained an MP until 2006, before retiring from politics at the 2006 general election.

Education
Lee was educated at Queenstown Secondary Technical School and Raffles Institution, before being awarded a President's Scholarship to study at Imperial College London, where he completed a BSc (Hons) degree in chemical engineering. He subsequently completed a Diploma in Business Administration at the University of Singapore.

Personal life
Lee is an ethnic Hokkien and is married to Adeline Oh Choon Neo and has one son and one daughter. His son, Desmond Lee, is a politician who is currently a Member of Parliament for West Coast GRC and Minister for National Development.

References

	

	

Members of the Cabinet of Singapore
Members of the Parliament of Singapore
People's Action Party politicians
President's Scholars
Singaporean people of Hokkien descent
1946 births
Living people
Ministers for Education of Singapore
Ministers for Labour of Singapore